Super American is an American pop punk band from Buffalo, New York.

History
Forming around 2016, Super American have released a debut EP and two studio albums. The music video Free Bird, a single released from their 2021 album SUP, features special effects designed by Matt West of Neck Deep. The duo of Matt Cox and Pat Feeley have been described as multi-instrumentalists. The name of their three-song release Yobwoc (2020) is an ananym of cowboy. The band is currently represented by Good Harbor Artist Management & Agency for the Performing Arts.

The duo spent most of 2015 & 2016 conceptualizing the genesis and purpose of the band. Once conceived, it was put to action. To build relationships by attending creative events -- art shows, concerts, parties -- while carrying around and photographing guests with a pineapple. After releasing their first work, Disposable, in 2017, Feeley purchased Cox a 2001 Ford Taurus Hatchback. Together, they would use this wagon to endure a series of regional DIY tours. Shortly after, the band signed their first record contract with Boston, MA based indie label, Take This To Heart Records.  While continuing to build their fan base, the band began demoing songs which would ultimately become Tequila Sunrise, which was properly recorded in the early spring of 2018 at GCR Audio in Buffalo, NY. Subsequent to the release of Tequila Sunrise's lead singles, "Hands Down Olivia", "Givin' It Up", and "Chris From Walmart", the band embarked on their first national tour in the summer of 2018, along with Gleemer and Kississippi, supporting Have Mercy on a 5 year album anniversary tour. 

The band spent most of 2019 working on material that would become both YOBWOC, an album sampler which ultimately led to the release the bands' biggest album yet, 2021's SUP.  Both Cox and Feeley worked collaboratively within their own home studios, building songs they felt expressed a stronger narrative. SUP was again recorded at GCR Audio in Buffalo, NY, however incited the hands of Jay Zubricky (Engineer), Vince Ratti (Mixing Engineer), and Will Yip (Mastering Engineer). SUP was released October 22, 2021 by Philadelphia, PA based indie record label Wax Bodega operated by Zack Zarillo and Fred Feldman. Vinyl production included to physical variants accompanied by a digital release.

In the fall of 2021, the band again hit the road, this time supporting Hot Mulligan, Prince Daddy & The Hyena, and Sincere Engineer, taking the band to the west coast for the first time.

Band members

Founding Members & Contributing Artists
Matt Cox 
Patrick Feeley

Live Band
Daniel McCormick
Sam J. Checkoway

Alumni
Jeffery Grabowski
Elliot Douglas
Fred Cimato
Greg McClure
Tom Falcone
Benjamin Leiber
Steven Gardner

Discography
Studio albums
SUP (2021, Wax Bodega)
Tequila Sunrise (2018, Take This To Heart Records)
EPs
 YOBWOC (2020)
Disposable (2017, Take This To Heart Records)

References

Pop punk groups from New York (state)
Musical groups from Buffalo, New York
Musical groups established in 2016
Take This To Heart Records artists